Something Awesome is the first solo album by the New Zealander rapper David Dallas, released on September 19, 2009 after his work with Frontline and their album Borrowed Time. On October 7, 2010 Something Awesome won the award for Best Urban/Hip Hop Album at the 2010 New Zealand Music Awards and was shortlisted for the inaugural Taite Music Prize.

Release and charts
The album was released by Dirty Records on September 19, 2009. It debuted on the New Zealand Albums Chart at No. 20 the following week.

Singles
The first single released off "Something Awesome" was "Indulge Me", featuring Devolo, another New Zealand rapper. "Indulge Me" was released on February 23, 2009, and peaked at number 34 on the New Zealand Singles Chart and stayed in the charts for 3 weeks.

The second single, "Big Time", was released in July. The third single, "I Get The Feelin' ", was released in October

Track listing

References

2009 albums
David Dallas albums